Brandon Wilds (born July 22, 1993) is an American football running back who is a free agent. He played college football at South Carolina and was signed by the Atlanta Falcons as an undrafted free agent in 2016.

High school career
Wilds attended Blythewood High School in Blythewood, South Carolina and played football under head coach Geremy Saitz. As a junior, Wilds ran for 1,551 yards and 20 touchdowns. As a senior, he had 175 rushing attempts for 818 yards and eight touchdowns. He finished his high school football career with a total of 500 carries for 2,700 rushing yards and 29 rushing touchdowns in 33 games.

He graduated from Blythewood in 2011 and was rated a three-star recruit from Rivals.com. Wilds received offers from East Carolina, Arkansas, Maryland, Illinois, and South Carolina.

College career
Wilds began attending South Carolina in 2011 and entered fall camp as the Gamecock's fifth running back on their depth chart. He became the starter after injuries to Marcus Lattimore, Shon Carson, Kenny Miles, and Eric Baker. He finished his freshman campaign with 107 carries for 486 rushing yards and three touchdowns. As a sophomore in 2012, Wilds was redshirted after suffering a high ankle sprain. He returned the following season, but was held to only seven games and two starts after suffering hamstring and elbow injuries. Wilds finished the 2013 season with 43 rushing attempts for 221 rushing yards and three rushing touchdowns.  He returned as a junior in 2014 and played in 12 games, starting four. Wilds was South Carolina's second leading rusher with 570 yards and also finished with 106 carries, four rushing touchdowns, 18 receptions, 143 receiving yards, and a receiving touchdown. As a senior, he led the Gamecocks with 567 rushing yards as a senior and started in nine games. Wilds missed three games in the 2015 season with bruised ribs.

Collegiate statistics

Professional career

Pre-draft
Coming out of South Carolina, Wilds was projected by the majority of analysts to go undrafted and was ranked the 29th best running back by NFLDraftScout.com. He attended and participated in the NFL Scouting Combine. Although he completed all of the possible drills at the combine, Wilds chose to redo the broad jump, vertical jump, short shuttle, and three-cone drill at South Carolina's Pro Day.

Atlanta Falcons

After Wilds went undrafted during the 2016 NFL Draft, the Atlanta Falcons signed Wilds as an undrafted free agent on May 5, 2016. Although he had offers from other teams, he chose the Falcons to be closer to his daughter and his filmiliarity with their fullback Patrick DiMarco. He entered training camp competing to be the Falcon's third running back with Terron Ward. In his preseason debut against the Washington Redskins, Wilds had ten carries for 26 yards and scored a one-yard rushing touchdown during the Falcon's 23-17 opening preseason victory. The next week, he carried the ball eight times for 49 yards and ran for a 32-yard touchdown during a win over the Cleveland Browns. On September 3, 2016, the Falcons waived Wilds with an injury settlement.

New York Jets
On September 26, 2016, the New York Jets signed Wilds to their practice squad. On December 7, 2016, the Jets activated him to their active roster after placing Khiry Robinson on injured-reserve. On December 11, 2016, Wilds made his professional regular season-debut against the San Francisco 49ers, finishing with two carries for four-yards in a 23–17 overtime victory. On December 24, 2016, he had a season-high four rushing attempts for 14 yards in a 41–3 loss to the New England Patriots. The following week, he had four carries for nine yards and two receptions for 20 yards as the Jets routed the Buffalo Bills 30–10. His first career reception was a 12-yard pass from Ryan Fitzpatrick and he also had his first fumble recovery after a fumble by Fitzpatrick.

On July 27, 2017, Wilds was waived by the Jets.

Cleveland Browns
On July 28, 2017, Wilds was signed by the Cleveland Browns. He was waived/injured on September 1, 2017, and placed on injured reserve. He was released on September 12, 2017.

Jacksonville Jaguars
On October 9, 2017, Wilds was signed to the Jacksonville Jaguars' practice squad. He signed a reserve/future contract with the Jaguars on January 22, 2018.

On September 1, 2018, Wilds was waived by the Jaguars and was signed to the practice squad the next day. He was promoted to the active roster on September 15, 2018. He was waived on October 9, 2018.

Arizona Cardinals
On October 15, 2018, Wilds was signed to the Arizona Cardinals practice squad. He signed a reserve/future contract with the Cardinals on December 31, 2018. He was waived on May 10, 2019.

San Francisco 49ers
On August 10, 2019, Wilds was signed by the San Francisco 49ers. He was waived on August 21, but re-signed six days later. He was waived during final roster cuts on August 30, 2019.

Tampa Bay Vipers
Wilds signed with the XFL's Team 9 practice squad during the regular season. He was signed off of Team 9 by the Tampa Bay Vipers on March 9, 2020. He had his contract terminated when the league suspended operations on April 10, 2020.

Calgary Stampeders
Wilds signed with the Calgary Stampeders of the CFL on May 7, 2020. After the CFL canceled the 2020 season due to the COVID-19 pandemic, Wilds chose to opt-out of his contract with the Stampeders on September 3, 2020. He opted back in to his contract on January 11, 2021. He was placed on the suspended list on July 10, 2021.

References

1993 births
Living people
People from Blythewood, South Carolina
Players of American football from South Carolina
American football running backs
South Carolina Gamecocks football players
Atlanta Falcons players
New York Jets players
Cleveland Browns players
Jacksonville Jaguars players
Arizona Cardinals players
San Francisco 49ers players
Team 9 players
Tampa Bay Vipers players
Calgary Stampeders players